Janetiella is a genus of gall midges in the family Cecidomyiidae. There are at least thirty described species.

Species
These 33 species belong to the genus Janetiella:

 Janetiella acerifolii (Felt, 1907) i c g
 Janetiella acuticauda Kieffer & Herbst, 1906 c g
 Janetiella americana Felt, 1908 i c g
 Janetiella asplenifolia (Felt, 1907) i c g
 Janetiella breviaria Felt, 1908 i c g
 Janetiella brevicauda Felt, 1908 i c g
 Janetiella brevicornis (Felt, 1907) i g
 Janetiella castaneae (Felt, 1909) i g
 Janetiella coloradensis Felt, 1912 i c g
 Janetiella euphorbiae Stefani, 1908 c g
 Janetiella fallax Kieffer, 1904 c g
 Janetiella foliicola Marikovskij, 1956 c g
 Janetiella fortiana Trotter, 1901 c g
 Janetiella frankumi Harris, 2003 c g
 Janetiella genistae Kieffer, 1909 c g
 Janetiella glechomae Tavares, 1930 c g
 Janetiella goiranica Kieffer & Trotter, 1905 c g
 Janetiella infrafoli Monzen, 1955 c g
 Janetiella inquilina Felt, 1908 i
 Janetiella inquilinus (Felt, 1908) c g
 Janetiella kimurai Inouye, 1964 c g
 Janetiella lemeei (Kieffer, 1904) c g
 Janetiella ligni Felt, 1915 i
 Janetiella maculata Tavares, 1901 c g
 Janetiella montivaga Kieffer & Jörgensen, 1910 c g
 Janetiella oenephila (Haimhoffen, 1875) c g
 Janetiella salicicorniae Fedotova, 1984 c g
 Janetiella sanguinea Felt, 1908 i c g
 Janetiella siskiyou Felt, 1917 i c g
 Janetiella thymi (Kieffer, 1888) c g
 Janetiella tiliacea (Felt, 1907) i c g
 Janetiella tuberculi (Rübsaamen, 1889) c g
 Janetiella ulmii (Beutenmuller, 1907) i c g b

Data sources: i = ITIS, c = Catalogue of Life, g = GBIF, b = Bugguide.net

References

Further reading

 
 
 
 
 

Cecidomyiinae
Cecidomyiidae genera
Taxa named by Jean-Jacques Kieffer
Articles created by Qbugbot